The imperial election of 1438 was an imperial election held to select the emperor of the Holy Roman Empire.  It took place in Frankfurt on March 18.

Background 
The previous Holy Roman Emperor, Sigismund, Holy Roman Emperor, died on December 9, 1437.  His son-in-law Albert II of Germany succeeded him as Jure uxoris king of Hungary, Croatia and Bohemia.

The prince-electors convened to elect his successor were:

 Dietrich Schenk von Erbach, elector of Mainz
 Raban of Helmstatt, elector of Trier
 Dietrich II of Moers, elector of Cologne
 Louis IV, Elector Palatine, elector of the Electoral Palatinate
 Frederick II, Elector of Saxony, elector of Saxony
 Frederick I, Elector of Brandenburg, elector of Brandenburg

Albert, as king of Bohemia, was entitled to a vote.  However, he was in Bohemia suppressing an uprising and was not present at the election.

Elected 
Albert was elected.

1438
1438 in the Holy Roman Empire
15th-century elections
Non-partisan elections